The Superior Drillers were a Minnesota–Wisconsin League minor league baseball team based in Superior, Wisconsin that played in 1909. It was managed by Lew Drill. Drill, Phil Stremmel and, most notably, Hall of Fame shortstop Dave Bancroft played for the team.

References

Superior, Wisconsin
Minnesota-Wisconsin League teams
Baseball teams established in 1909
1909 establishments in Wisconsin
Defunct minor league baseball teams
Defunct baseball teams in Wisconsin
Professional baseball teams in Wisconsin
Baseball teams disestablished in 1909
1909 disestablishments in Wisconsin